Betsy King Ross (March 14, 1921 – October 4, 1989) was an American actress, anthropologist and author.

She was born in St Paul, Minnesota. During the 1930s she starred in several Western serial films as a child actress. In 1935 she starred with Gene Autry in the serial The Phantom Empire. She was also a champion trick rider.

Filmography
 The Phantom Empire (1935)
 Fighting with Kit Carson (1933)
 Smoke Lightning (1933)

References

External links

American film actresses
American child actresses
Film serial actresses
1921 births
1989 deaths
20th-century American actresses
20th-century American anthropologists